This is a list of the members of the Australian Senate in the First Australian Parliament, which was elected on 29 March 1901. There were 36 senators in this initial parliament. Terms were deemed to start on 1 January 1901. In accordance with section 13 of the Constitution, the Senate resolved that in each State the three senators who received the most votes would sit for a six-year term, finishing on 31 December 1906 while the other half would sit for a three-year term, finishing on 31 December 1903. The process for filing of casual vacancies was complex, with an initial appointment followed by an election. The status of political parties varied, being national, State based, and informal.

George Pearce, who died in 1952, was the last surviving member of the 1901-1903 Senate. Robert Best was the last surviving Protectionist member, and John Clemons was the last surviving Free Trade member.

Senators

Notes

References

Members of Australian parliaments by term
20th-century Australian politicians
Australian Senate lists